The first series of The Green Green Grass originally aired between 9 September 2005 and 14 October 2005, beginning with the episode "Keep On Running". A Christmas special aired on 25 December 2005.

Outline
The series introduced the seven main characters that would appear in further series. These were: 

Lisa Diveney's character, Beth, who was Tyler's girlfriend, became a regular from the episode "Pillow Talk".

Episode

Production
The series was produced by Shazam Production, a company that produces comedies by John Sullivan. The series was filmed at Teddington Studios, with a live audience. All episodes in the first series were directed by Tony Dow, director of Only Fools and Horses.

Reception

Viewers
The series began airing on Friday evenings, at 8:30pm. The series was an immediate hit with viewers, with the first episode, "Keep On Running" gaining 9.13 million viewers, which was in the top five of the highest rating for the week ending 11 September 2005. Ratings then fell for the next two episodes before steadily rising again. The second half of the series performed much better than most other sitcoms, with episode four going back up above 6 million viewers. The following two episodes remained at the six million mark. The ratings were high enough for a new series, of seven episodes, to be commissioned. A 2005 Christmas special was also commissioned.

Note: Viewership value taken from Barb.Note: Audience Percentage value taken from Digital Spy.

Critics
The comedy has been criticised due to its spin-off roots. As a spin-off of the nation's favourite sitcom, The Green Green Grass was always going to have a difficult start. The series received has always received negative reviews from critics and some fans of Only Fools and Horses alike. The series has continued to run due to the bigger than usual audiences it attracts and the general thoughts towards it. Many have said that The Green Green Grass without Only Fools and Horses behind it is fantastic but the minute you put Only Fools and Horses back in the picture, The Green Green Grass loses its good points.

References
Specific

General
The Green Green Grass at BBC Comedy
The Green Green Grass Official website
The Green Green Grass at British TV Comedy
British Sitcom Guide for The Green Green Grass
The Green Green Grass at Only Fools and Horses website
 

2005 British television seasons
The Green Green Grass